Savasleyka may refer to:
Savasleyka (air base), an air base in Nizhny Novgorod Oblast, Russia
Savasleyka (rural locality), a rural locality (a selo) in Nizhny Novgorod Oblast, Russia